Khoda Bakhsh Jadegal Tukani (also Romanized as Khodā Bakhsh Jadegāl Tūkānī) is a village in Pir Sohrab Rural District, in the Central District of Chabahar County, Sistan and Baluchestan Province, Iran. At the 2006 census, its population was 224, in 32 families.

References 

Populated places in Chabahar County